ISO 3166-2:KM is the entry for the Comoros in ISO 3166-2, part of the ISO 3166 standard published by the International Organization for Standardization (ISO), which defines codes for the names of the principal subdivisions (e.g., provinces or states) of all countries coded in ISO 3166-1.

Currently for the Comoros, ISO 3166-2 codes are defined for 3 islands.

Each code consists of two parts, separated by a hyphen. The second part is a letter.

Current codes
Subdivision names are listed as in the ISO 3166-2 standard published by the ISO 3166 Maintenance Agency (ISO 3166/MA).

ISO 639-1 codes are used to represent subdivision names in the following administrative languages. The Shikomor language does not have a single ISO 639 code.
 (ar): Arabic using two romanization systems
 (fr): French
 (—): Shikomor

Click on the button in the header to sort each column.

Changes
The following changes to the entry have been announced in newsletters by the ISO 3166/MA since the first publication of ISO 3166-2 in 1998. ISO stopped issuing newsletters in 2013.

The following changes to the entry are listed on ISO's online catalogue, the Online Browsing Platform:

See also
 Subdivisions of the Comoros
 FIPS region codes of the Comoros

External links
 ISO Online Browsing Platform: KM
 Autonomous Islands of Comoros, Statoids.com

2:KM
ISO 3166-2
Comoros geography-related lists